Consilium may refer to:

Consilia, a literary genre
Consilium de Emendanda Ecclesia, a 1536 report commissioned by Pope Paul III on the abuses in the Catholic Church
Consilium Place, an office complex in the Scarborough district of Toronto, Canada
Consilium ad exsequendam Constitutionem de Sacra Liturgia, a commission entrusted with the reform of the liturgy, including the Mass of Paul VI
Council of the European Union, or Consilium, institution in bicameral legislature of the European Union
Aulic Council or Consilium Aulicum, of the Holy Roman Empire
Sacrosanctum Concilium, a conciliar constitution, after the Second Vatican Council

See also
Concilium (disambiguation)